The 2017–18 North Carolina Central Eagles men's basketball team represented North Carolina Central University during the 2017–18 NCAA Division I men's basketball season. The Eagles, led by ninth-year head coach LeVelle Moton, played their home games at McDougald–McLendon Gymnasium in Durham, North Carolina as members of the Mid-Eastern Athletic Conference. They finished the season 19–16, 9–7 in MEAC play to finish sixth place. In the MEAC tournament, they defeated Coppin State, Savannah State, and Morgan State to advance to the championship game against Hampton. There they defeated the Pirates to receive the conference's automatic bid to the NCAA tournament for the second consecutive year. As a No. 16 seed, they lost in the First Four to Texas Southern.

Previous season
The Eagles finished the 2016–17 season 25–9, 13–2 in MEAC play to win the MEAC regular season championship. In the MEAC tournament, they defeated Bethune–Cookman, Maryland Eastern Shore, and Norfolk State to win the tournament championship. As a result, they earned the conference's automatic bid to the NCAA tournament. As a No. 16 seed, they lost in the First Four to fellow No. 16 seed UC Davis.

Roster

Schedule and results

|-
!colspan=9 style=| Non-conference regular season

|-
!colspan=9 style=| MEAC regular season

|-
!colspan=9 style=| MEAC tournament

|-
!colspan=9 style=| NCAA tournament

References

North Carolina Central Eagles men's basketball seasons
North Carolina Central
2018 in sports in North Carolina
2017 in sports in North Carolina
North Carolina Central